Zepeda is a Spanish surname. Notable people with the surname include:
Andrea-Mae Zepeda (born 1995), Austrian cricketer
David Zepeda of Nogales, Sonora, represented Mexico in the Manhunt International 2000 pageant, Singapore, in 2000
Gwendolyn Zepeda (born 1971), American author
Jose Zepeda, American boxer
Lorenzo Zepeda, President of El Salvador 1–7 February 1858
Luis Alberto Zepeda Félix, Paralympian athlete from Mexico competing mainly in category F53/F54 javelin events
Miguel Zepeda (born 1976), Mexican football player
Ofelia Zepeda (born 1952), Tohono O'odham poet and intellectual
Omar Zepeda (born 1977), Mexican race walker
Rafael Zepeda (born 1961), Mexican long-distance athlete
Selvin Bonifacio Zepeda (born 1981), Salvadoran football (soccer) player who represented El Salvador at international level